Fearless Frank is a 1967 American fantasy comedy film written and directed by Philip Kaufman. It is notable as the film debut of Jon Voight. Voight plays a murdered drifter who gets reanimated and turned into a superhero by a scientist (Severn Darden).  Other notable cast members include The Man With the Golden Arm author Nelson Algren as a mobster named Needles, and Word Jazz vocal artist Ken Nordine as the narrator, credited as "The Stranger."

Plot
Frank is an unsophisticated country boy who journeys to Chicago to find his fortune. Upon arrival he crosses the path of Plethora, who is on the run from a gangster known only as The Boss. The Boss's henchmen arrive, take Plethora and shoot Frank dead.

His body is discovered by The Good Doctor and his servant Alfred. Claude uses his invention to create what he believes will be a "brave new man", bringing Frank back to life. Claude trains Frank to become an educated and benevolent citizen, before revealing to his pupil that the latter has supernatural powers. Frank then begins his career as a crime-fighter, having many adventures and misadventures along the way.

Cast
 Monique van Vooren as Plethora
 Jon Voight as Fearless Frank
 Joan Darling as Lois
 Severn Darden as The Good Doctor / Claude, the mad scientist
 Anthony Holland as Alfred
 Lou Gilbert as The Boss
 Benito Carruthers as The Cat
 David Steinberg as The Rat
 David Fisher as Screwnose
 Nelson Algren as Needles

Production 
Philip Kaufman saw Jon Voight in an off-Broadway adaption of A View from a Bridge, allegedly stage-managed by a young Dustin Hoffman. Kaufman soon cast Voight in the film, which was shot circa 1965.

See also
List of American films of 1967

References

External links
 

1967 films
1960s fantasy comedy films
1960s superhero films
American fantasy comedy films
American superhero comedy films
Films directed by Philip Kaufman
1967 comedy films
Resurrection in film
1960s English-language films
1960s American films